William Ferdie Brown (December 2, 1940 – October 21, 2019) was an American professional football player, coach, and executive.  He played as a cornerback for the Denver Broncos and the Oakland Raiders in the National Football League (NFL). Following his playing career, Brown remained with the Raiders as an assistant coach.  He served as the head football coach at California State University, Long Beach in 1991, the final season before the school's football program was terminated. Brown was inducted into the Pro Football Hall of Fame as a player in 1984. At the time of his death he was on the Raiders' administrative staff.

Playing career
Brown played college football at Grambling State University and was not drafted by any professional team after leaving school in 1963.  He was signed by the Houston Oilers of the American Football League (AFL), but was cut from the team during training camp.  He was then signed by the AFL's Denver Broncos and became a starter by the middle of his rookie season.  He won All-AFL honors in his second season and played in the AFL All-Star Game.

In 1967, Brown was traded within the Western Division to the Oakland Raiders and spent the remainder of his playing career there.  He served as defensive captain for 10 of his 12 years with the team.  He was named to five AFL All-Star games and four NFL Pro Bowls. He was also named All-AFL three times and All-NFL four times.

Perhaps Brown's most memorable moment as a Raider came late in Super Bowl XI, when he intercepted a Fran Tarkenton pass with under six minutes remaining and returned it a Super Bowl-record 75 yards for the clinching touchdown. NFL Films immortalized Brown's play with a film clip of Brown running with the ball, appearing to be running straight to the camera. He was also given a popular nickname as a result of Bill King's radio call of the play: "He (Tarkenton) looks and throws...intercepted by the Oakland Raiders Willie Brown at the 30, 40, 50...he’s going all the way!...Old Man Willie!...Touchdown Raiders!" His record stood for 29 years, until it was broken by Kelly Herndon's non-scoring 76-yard interception return from the end zone in Super Bowl XL.

Brown retired after the 1978 season, and finished his Raiders career with 39 interceptions, tied for first all-time on the team. He finished his sixteen seasons in professional football with 54 interceptions, which he returned for 472 yards and two touchdowns.  He also recovered three fumbles.

Brown was selected to the American Football League All-Time Team and was inducted into the Pro Football Hall of Fame on July 28, 1984, his first year of eligibility. In 1999, he was ranked number 50 on The Sporting News' list of the 100 Greatest Football Players, making him the highest-ranking Raiders player.

Coaching career
Brown served as a defensive backfield coach for the Raiders from 1979 to 1988.  He was also the last head football coach at Long Beach State before the program was discontinued. Brown had succeeded George Allen, who had died just after the end of the 1990 season. He earned a master's degree at the same school in 1991, and later coached at Jordan High School in Los Angeles in 1994. In 1995, he returned to the Raiders as the Director of Staff Development.

Awards
 All-AFL Team (1964)
 Five AFL All-Star Games (1964–65, 1967–69)
 Named to the All-Time AFL Team in 1969
 Four AFC-NFC Pro Bowls (1970–73)
 Named to the Pro Football 25-year All-Star team
 Inducted into the Pro Football Hall of Fame in 1984
 Inducted into the Louisiana Sports Hall of Fame in 1985
 Inducted into the Mississippi Sports Hall of Fame in 1994

Records
 Previously held Super Bowl record for longest interception (75 yards, Super Bowl XI), now held by Pittsburgh Steelers Linebacker James Harrison (100 yards, Super Bowl XLIII)
 Oakland Raiders franchise leader for interceptions (39, t-1st)

Death
Brown died on October 21, 2019, at the age of 78.

Head coaching record

See also
 List of American Football League players

References

External links
 
 

1940 births
2019 deaths
African-American coaches of American football
African-American players of American football
American Conference Pro Bowl players
American football cornerbacks
American Football League All-Star players
American Football League All-Time Team
American Football League players
California State University, Long Beach alumni
Denver Broncos (AFL) players
Grambling State Tigers football players
High school football coaches in California
Long Beach State 49ers football coaches
Oakland Raiders coaches
Oakland Raiders executives
Oakland Raiders players
People from Yazoo City, Mississippi
Players of American football from Mississippi
Pro Football Hall of Fame inductees
20th-century African-American sportspeople
21st-century African-American people